Spondylerpeton is an extinct genus of tetrapod closely related to "Cricotus" (Archeria) in the family Archeriidae. This genus is known from fragmentary remains, namely a short series of tail vertebrae preserved in an ironstone nodule. These remains were found in the Mazon Creek beds of Illinois, an area famed for its preservation of Carboniferous plants and animals. Spondylerpeton individuals were probably about three to four feet in length, by far the largest animals known to have inhabited the Mazon Creek area during this era.

References 

Embolomeres
Carboniferous tetrapods of North America
Paleozoic Illinois